Affinity Plus Federal Credit Union is a Minnesota-based, not-for-profit financial cooperative with 27 branches and about $1.7 billion in assets. It serves more than 600,000 members with financial products and services including checking and savings accounts, consumer loans, mortgages, credit cards, investment and retirement accounts, and more. Affinity Plus lists its core values of "Caring," "Integrity," and "Adaptability," as informing their stated commitment to "building stronger communities across Minnesota." The credit union is led by president and CEO Dave Larson, a position he has held since 2013.

Eligibility
A person is eligible to join Affinity Plus if they, a family member, or a household member satisfy one of the following criteria:

1. Is an employee of:
 The State of Minnesota
 The University of Minnesota
 A Preferred Partner company
 Affinity Plus Federal Credit Union
 Any organization that receives funding from the State of Minnesota, including most schools, community colleges, private and public universities, nursing homes and hospitals, counties, cities, municipalities, and nonprofit groups

2. Is a student or alumnus of any Minnesota State college or university or the University of Minnesota Twin Cities campus.

3. Lives, works, or worships in:
 Arden Hills
 Minneapolis (Downtown)
 Mounds View
 New Brighton
 Roseville
 Shoreview
 St. Anthony
 St. Paul (Downtown)
 White Earth Reservation
4. Is a dues-paying member of the Affinity Plus Foundation

References

Credit unions based in Minnesota